The DeltaHawk DH160 is an American aircraft engine, under development by DeltaHawk Engines, Inc. of Racine, Wisconsin and intended for use in light aircraft.

Design and development 
The engine is a four-cylinder two-stroke, V-layout, liquid-cooled, direct-drive, diesel engine design, which is intended to produce .

The company intended to complete Federal Aviation Administration type certification , but did not achieve their goal.

Specifications (DH160)

See also

References

External links 

DeltaHawk aircraft engines
2010s aircraft piston engines
Aircraft diesel engines